The Somalia Reconciliation and Restoration Council (SRRC) was a political movement and paramilitary organization based in southern Somalia. It was founded in 2001 by Hussein Mohamed Farrah Aidid, son of the late faction leader Mohamed Farrah Aidid. Growing out of the Somali National Alliance (SNA) led by Aidid, the SRRC was originally formed to oppose the nascent Transitional National Government (TNG) and the Juba Valley Alliance (JVA) in the 2001-2004 period. However, it eventually settled differences with the government and some moderate leaders were incorporated into the new interim administration.

Leaders and member Interim Government of Somalia

Somali Civil War

Hussein Aidid refused to recognize the newly forming Mogadishu-based Transitional National Government (TNG) of Somalia, the precursor of the present Transitional Federal Government (TFG), accusing it of "harboring militant Islamist sympathizers." Instead he formed the rival Somali Reconciliation and Restoration Council (SRRC) in early 2001.

On May 12, 2001, his forces captured Mogadishu's seaport after a battle with the Suleiman tribe left 19 combatants and 21 civilians dead.

At some time during late 2001, he advised US President George W. Bush that a money transfer and telecommunications company, Al Barakaat, "had ties to terrorists and that there were terrorists in Somalia sympathetic to Osama bin Laden." He also "warned that militant Islamist Pakistani proselytizers were active in Mogadishu and other Somali cities and that they have strong links to Al-Itihad Al-Islami."

The SRRC was backed by the United States and Ethiopia (see Ethiopian involvement in Somalia) against other factions in the Somali Civil War. On Wednesday, May 15, 2002, Ethiopian soldiers attacked and temporarily captured the border town of Beledhawo with the help of the SRRC after the town had been captured by a rival militia. During the raid, the commander of the rival militia, Colonel Abdirizak Issak Bihi, was captured by the Ethiopian forces and taken across the border to Ethiopia. After the raid, control of the town was turned over to the SRRC.

In June 2002, faction leader Mohamed Dhere supported the SRRC and fought the TNG.

The SRRC battled with the Juba Valley Alliance (JVA) in 2002, resulting in 6,000 refugees fleeing Bulo Hawa. In 2003, there were 15,000 internally displaced persons (IDPs) accommodated in Kismayo. Fighting throughout southern and central Somalia resulted in 86,000 IDPs by 2004. Landmines were cited as a problem affecting the area due to the fighting between the JVA and SRRC.

In July 2003, at the Somali National Reconciliation Conference, the SRRC and TNG leadership reached key compromises: "The TNG accepted the number of parliamentarians proposed by the SRRC while the latter approved the inclusion of politicians as requested by the TNG."

References

Factions in the Somali Civil War
2001 establishments in Somalia
Organizations established in 2001
Organizations disestablished in 2004
2004 disestablishments in Somalia